Dienestrol (brand names Ortho Dienestrol, Dienoestrol, Dienoestrol Ortho, Sexadien, Denestrolin, Dienol, Dinovex, Follormon, Oestrodiene, Synestrol, numerous others), also known as dienoestrol, is a synthetic nonsteroidal estrogen of the stilbestrol group which is or was used to treat menopausal symptoms in the United States and Europe. It has been studied for use by rectal administration in the treatment of prostate cancer in men as well. The medication was introduced in the U.S. in 1947 by Schering as Synestrol and in France in 1948 as Cycladiene. Dienestrol is a close analogue of diethylstilbestrol. It has approximately 223% and 404% of the affinity of estradiol at the ERα and ERβ, respectively.

Dienestrol diacetate (brand names Faragynol, Gynocyrol, others) also exists and has been used medically.

Isomers

See also
 Benzestrol
 Hexestrol
 Methestrol

References

Abandoned drugs
Phenols
Stilbenoids
Synthetic estrogens